Matthew Chervenak is the founder, President and CEO of General Biologic (GBI), a China-based, healthcare focused consulting firm and data company. He founded the company in Shanghai in 2002. Chervenak also serves as the Chairman of the Healthcare Committee at the American Chamber of Commerce (Amcham) in Shanghai. Prior to establishing General Biologic, Chervenak was a strategist at Sapient Corporation in New York City and researcher at New York University Medical Center and the National Institutes of Health.  Chervenak graduated with a B.S. in Biology from Pennsylvania State University.

Chervenak regularly contributes to international publications and speaks at industry conferences about China's pharmaceutical and biotechnology sectors. Chervenak believes that China is an ideal base for global biogenerics. In an editorial, Chervenak wrote that China's low-cost, highly skilled technologists and scientists, a strong track record in life-science research, a high-quality talent pool of returnee overseas Chinese, advantageous regulations and tax policy, and China's entrepreneurial culture, all contribute to create a bright future for China's life sciences industry. Even in the controversial case of intellectual property in the life sciences field in China, according to Chervenak, as long as foreign firms protect their IP in the most lucrative markets, it is usually not worth being overly concerned about violations in China, where the market is still small.

References

Living people
Year of birth missing (living people)
Place of birth missing (living people)
Eberly College of Science alumni
American chief executives
New York University Grossman School of Medicine faculty